The 1991–92 Canada men's national ice hockey team represented Canada at the 1992 Winter Olympics held at the Méribel Ice Palace in Méribel, a ski resort about 45 km from host city of Albertville, France.

Canada's team, coached by Dave King, team won the silver medal.

1992 Winter Olympics roster
Head coach: Dave King
Dave Archibald
Todd Brost
Sean Burke
Kevin Dahl
Curt Giles
Dave Hannan
Gord Hynes
Fabian Joseph
Joé Juneau
Trevor Kidd
Patrick Lebeau
Chris Lindberg
Eric Lindros
Kent Manderville
Adrien Plavsic
Dan Ratushny
Sam Saint-Laurent
Brad Schlegel
Wally Schreiber
Randy Smith
Dave Tippett
Brian Tutt
Jason Woolley

See also
 Canada men's national ice hockey team
 Ice hockey at the 1992 Winter Olympics
 Ice hockey at the Olympic Games
 List of Canadian national ice hockey team rosters

References

 
Canada men's national ice hockey team seasons